Sophie Katrina Walton (born 7 November 1989) is an English retired footballer who played as a midfielder. She played for Leeds United, Notts County, Doncaster Rovers Belles, and Sheffield United. She represented England at youth level.

Club career
Walton grew up in Sherburn-in-Elmet and played football for Sherburn White Rose before joining Leeds United under-12s at the age of nine. In September 2005, she made her Premier League debut for Leeds in a 2–0 defeat at Charlton Athletic.

On 11 February 2010 Walton started a 3–1 Premier League Cup final win over Everton, to help Leeds win their first major silverware, following defeats in the FA Women's Cup finals of 2006 and 2008, as well as the Premier League Cup final in 2007.

When Leeds failed to gain entry to the new FA WSL, Walton reportedly signed for local rivals Doncaster Rovers Belles. But when the inaugural 2011 FA WSL season started, Walton instead lined up for Lincoln Ladies. She remained with the club after their relocation to Notts County for the 2014 FA WSL season, and played in the 2015 FA Women's Cup Final, a 1–0 defeat by Chelsea at Wembley Stadium.

Walton left Notts County on the expiry of her contract and sat out the 2016 season due to pregnancy and childbirth. She agreed to join FA WSL 2 club Doncaster Rovers Belles in January 2017. Doncaster Rovers Belles won the WSL 2 league title but renounced their place in the new FA Women's Championship, sparking a player exodus which saw Walton join Guiseley Vixens in July 2018.

She retired in April 2022.

International career
Walton represented England at Under-15, Under-17, Under-19 and Under-23 level, as well as at the 2008 FIFA U-20 Women's World Cup in Chile.

Personal life
Her older brother Simon Walton is also a footballer, who began his own career at Leeds United.

In August 2016 Walton gave birth to a son Alfie-J, with her footballer partner Jake Cassidy. She graduated from Leeds Beckett University with a business management degree and founded a modelling agency at the age of 23, which she later put on hold to focus on football.

Both Sophie and Simon Walton studied at Boston Spa Academy during their time as Leeds United Academy scholars.

References

External links

 
 
 Doncaster Rovers Belles player profile
 Leeds United Ladies player profile
 

Living people
1989 births
English women's footballers
Women's association football midfielders
Women's Super League players
FA Women's National League players
Doncaster Rovers Belles L.F.C. players
Notts County L.F.C. players
Leeds United Women F.C. players
Footballers from Leeds
Association footballers' wives and girlfriends
People from Sherburn in Elmet
People educated at Boston Spa Academy
Sheffield United W.F.C. players
Women's Championship (England) players
Leeds City Vixens L.F.C. players
Nottingham Forest Women F.C. players
England women's youth international footballers
England women's under-23 international footballers